Victor Rydberg may refer to:

Viktor Rydberg (1828 – 1895), Swedish writer and a member of the Swedish Academy
Victor Crus Rydberg (born 1995), Swedish ice hockey player

Human name disambiguation pages